Todd Robinson (born June 16, 1978) is a Canadian former professional ice hockey center. He predominantly played in the minor hockey leagues most notably with the Muskegon Fury and the Muskegon Lumberjacks. He last played in the 2013–14 season with the Tulsa Oilers of the Central Hockey League before announcing his retirement and taking up an assistant coaching role with major junior team, the Muskegon Lumberjacks  of the United States Hockey League.

Awards and honours

Career statistics

References

External links

1978 births
Living people
Allen Americans players
Canadian ice hockey centres
Chicago Wolves players
Cincinnati Mighty Ducks players
Colorado Gold Kings players
Evansville IceMen players
Grand Rapids Griffins players
Hamilton Bulldogs (AHL) players
Idaho Steelheads (WCHL) players
Muskegon Fury players
Muskegon Lumberjacks players
Odessa Jackalopes players
Portland Winterhawks players
SønderjyskE Ishockey players
Tulsa Oilers (1992–present) players
Canadian expatriate ice hockey players in Denmark
Canadian expatriate ice hockey players in the United States